Ateghe Sediqi (born Pouran Rajai on 2 September 1943) is an Iranian politician and human rights activist who was the wife of former Iranian President Mohammad-Ali Rajai. She was also a member of Iranian Parliament from 1981 to 1992.

Career
Pouran Rajai was born on 2 September 1943 in Qazvin, Iran. She renamed to Ateghe Sediqi in 1975 because of his activities during Iranian Revolution.

She accompanied her husband in activities against Pahlavi regime. She also helped Rajai in the establishment of Refah School and managed the school after her husband entered politics. She was also one of the members of the welcoming staff when Ruhollah Khomeini returned to Iran from exile on 1 February 1979. After Rajai was assassinated in a bombing on 30 August 1981, Sediqi was nominated for the parliamentary seat of Tehran, Rey, Shemiranat and Eslamshahr district in a by-election held on 2 October 1981. She won the election with 1,842,746 votes. She was also re-elected in the 1984 and 1988 elections. However, her nomination for the 1992 election was rejected by the Guardian Council. She supported Mir-Hossein Mousavi in the 2009 presidential election and retired from politics after the election. She opposed former President Mahmoud Ahmadinejad and believed that Ahmadinejad has appropriated her husband's name.

References

1943 births
Living people
Members of the Women's fraction of Islamic Consultative Assembly
People from Qazvin
Deputies of Tehran, Rey, Shemiranat and Eslamshahr
Islamic Republican Party politicians
People of the Iranian Revolution
Iranian revolutionaries
Members of the 1st Islamic Consultative Assembly
Members of the 2nd Islamic Consultative Assembly
Members of the 3rd Islamic Consultative Assembly
Islamic Association of Teachers of Iran politicians
Wives of presidents of Iran